Taranaki Diocesan School for Girls ( formerly known as St Mary's Diocesan School, Stratford) is an all-girls Anglican secondary school in Stratford, Taranaki, New Zealand. Taranaki Dio has a boarding hostel, and the majority of the students at the school are boarders. In October 2018 St Mary's was renamed as Taranaki Diocesan School for Girls and the chapel rededicated to be known as the Chapel of St Mary.

Notes

External links 
 

Anglican schools in New Zealand
Secondary schools in Taranaki
Girls' schools in New Zealand
Stratford, New Zealand
Boarding schools in New Zealand
Educational institutions established in 1914
Schools in Taranaki
1914 establishments in New Zealand